Jeanesville or Jeansville is an unincorporated community in Hazle Township, Luzerne County, Pennsylvania. In 1891 a mine in Jeanesville flooded, killing 18 miners. Former NFL player Knuckles Boyle was born in Jeanesville.

References

Populated places in Luzerne County, Pennsylvania